Station Road may refer to:

Station Road, Cambridge, leads to Cambridge railway station, England
Station Road, Darley Dale, a cricket ground in Darley Dale, England
Station Road, Newbridge, a sports venue located in Newbridge, County Kildare, Republic of Ireland
Station Road, Swinton, a former rugby league Test match venue located in Pendlebury near Manchester, England
Station Road (York), in England

Odonyms referring to a building